Kositsyna is a rural locality (a selo) in Plesetsky District of the Arkhangelsk Oblast, Russia. Population:

References 

Rural localities in Plesetsky District